In 2016, Owen Smith, the Member of Parliament for Pontypridd, challenged Jeremy Corbyn for the leadership of the Labour Party, triggering an election in the United Kingdom, one year following the previous leadership ballot. His candidacy was announced in a statement on 13 July 2016, in which he declared himself to be a supporter of many of Corbyn's policies but that Corbyn did not possess the qualities necessary to win the next general election. He pledged to prevent the party from splitting and to lead Labour back into government.

Smith initially faced Angela Eagle as a fellow challenger to Jeremy Corbyn, but her withdrawal from the race on 19 July 2016, resulting from Smith's stronger level of support in the Parliamentary Labour Party, left him as the sole candidate facing the incumbent.

Economic policy 
Smith is anti-austerity and an opponent of the Conservative's public spending cuts since 2010. At the launch of his party leadership campaign in July 2016, he described himself as someone who is also "pro-prosperity".

British New Deal 
He has proposed that £200 billion be invested to "rebuild Britain", focused on "building homes, renewing our transport links, schools and hospitals, as well as Sure Start centres, and care for older people". Smith said that doubling the number of homes built would be an important part of these plans.

Employment laws 
In late July 2016, Smith said that, if elected leader of the Labour Party, he would ban zero-hour contracts and end the public sector pay freeze, saying that "The public sector pay freeze cannot continue while the costs – of housing and heating, transport and childcare – continue to rise". He said he would also reintroduce Wage Councils for hotel, shop and care workers, most of which were abolished during the 1980s and 1990s. Smith released proposals for policies aimed at improving workers rights such as a repeal of the 'Trade Unions Act' and a commitment to ensure workers' representation on remuneration committees. Smith also proposed replacing the current Department of Work and Pensions with a new 'Ministry for Labour' and a revived Department for Social Security.

Housing 
In an interview with The Guardian in mid July, Smith said that housing – doubling the number of homes built – would be an important part of his platform.

Taxation 
Smith has suggested that income tax rates on the highest paid should be increased, with a top rate of 50%, claiming that recent party policy had been "too timid". He has also promised to reverse cuts in Corporation Tax due to take place up until 2020 whilst reversing the cuts made to Capital Gains Tax and Inheritance Tax in the Summer Budget.

Immigration policy 
Smith has said that Labour must be overtly pro-immigration, even if it means losing votes to UKIP. He said Labour should champion the benefits of immigration such as helping economic growth and staffing public services. Previously Smith had suggested that immigration put pressure on wages.

Foreign policy

Brexit deal referendum 
On 13 July 2016, and following the vote to leave the EU three weeks previously, Smith pledged that he would press for an early general election or offer a further referendum on the final 'Brexit' deal drawn up by the new Prime Minister, were he to be elected Labour leader.  He also said: "I don't think we should accept we're on a definite path out. I think we need to make sure people are satisfied". According to The Guardian, Smith is in favour of a second referendum on "whatever Brexit deal May's team negotiates with the other 27 EU member states", although a BBC report described his position as "Would be 'tempted' to call a second EU referendum."

War Powers Act 
Smith has proposed a new piece of legislation to be brought to Parliament, ensuring that any Prime Minister seeking support for military action must defend that action as a last resort.

Defence policy

Trident renewal 
When interviewed on the Today programme in July 2016, Smith revealed that he used to be a member of the Campaign for Nuclear Disarmament and "fundamentally wants the world to be without nuclear bombs." He has described himself as being a "sceptic" of the Trident nuclear programme and as favouring a multilateralist approach to nuclear disarmament (a position he noted as being Bevanite). In the weeks before the 2015 general election, he told a hustings audience that he regretted Ed Miliband's policy to renew Trident, saying: "would but we could get rid of it, but I fear that we can't." In 2016, he stated that he would vote to renew Trident, saying: "I want a world without nuclear weapons altogether, but I don't think we hasten that by divesting." Smith did vote in favour of the government's Trident renewal programme motion on 18 July 2016, as did another 139 Labour MPs, in line with long-standing party policy on at-sea nuclear deterrent.

Party reforms

Gender balance 
Smith pledged that he would introduce all-female shortlists in target seats at elections, as a means of achieving gender balance in the Parliamentary Labour Party.

Reintroduction of Clause IV 

Smith advocated a further re-edit of 'Clause IV' which advocated the 'fight against inequality' over a return to the original Clause IV.

Endorsements

References 

2016 in British politics
2016 Labour Party (UK) leadership election
Owen Smith Labour Party leadership campaign